Clepsis parva is a species of moth of the family Tortricidae. It is found in Ecuador in Pichincha-Septimo Paraiso Reserve.

The wingspan is 10–11 mm. The ground colour of the forewings is pale yellowish creamy, sprinkled or suffused with grey especially in dorsal third of the wing. The hindwings are whitish creamy, but grey on the periphery.

Etymology
The species name refers to the small size of the species and is derived from parvus (meaning small).

References

Moths described in 2004
Clepsis